Andre Kostelanetz (December 22, 1901 – January 13, 1980) was a Russian-born American popular orchestral music conductor and arranger who was one of the major exponents of popular orchestra music.

Biography

Abram Naumovich Kostelyanetz was born in Saint Petersburg, Russia to a prominent Jewish family. He was a cousin of physicist Lew Kowarski.

His father, Nachman Yokhelevich (Naum Ignatyevich) Kostelyanetz, was active on the St. Petersburg stock exchange; his maternal grandfather, Aizik Yevelevich Dymshitz, was a wealthy merchant and industrialist, engaged in timber production. Kostelanetz began playing the piano at four and a half years old. He studied composition and orchestration at the Petrograd Conservatory of Music. When he was 19, the Grand Petrograd Opera Company held a competition to select a chorusmaster and assistant conductor, in which he was selected despite being the youngest applicant. Kostelanetz continued there until leaving Russia in March 1922 after the Russian Revolution, when he stayed in Paris for a time before moving on to the United States.

He arrived in the United States that year, and in the 1920s, conducted concerts for radio. In the 1930s, he began his own weekly show on CBS, Andre Kostelanetz Presents. Kostelanetz was known for arranging and recording light classical music pieces for mass audiences, as well as orchestral versions of songs and Broadway show tunes. He made numerous recordings over the course of his career, which had sales of over 50 million. For many years, he conducted the New York Philharmonic in pops concerts and recordings, in which they were billed as Andre Kostelanetz and His Orchestra.

Kostelanetz may be best known to modern audiences for a series of easy listening instrumental albums on Columbia Records from the 1940s until 1980. Kostelanetz actually started making this music before there was a genre called "easy listening". He continued until after some of his contemporaries, including Mantovani, had stopped recording. Outside the United States, one of his best known works was an orchestral arrangement of the tune "With a Song in my Heart", which was the signature tune of a long-running BBC radio program, at first called Forces Favourites, then Family Favourites, and finally Two Way Family Favourites.

He commissioned many works, including Aaron Copland's Lincoln Portrait, Jerome Kern's Portrait of Mark Twain, William Schuman's New England Triptych, Paul Creston's Frontiers, Ferde Grofé's Hudson River Suite, Virgil Thomson's musical portraits of Fiorello La Guardia and Dorothy Thompson, Alan Hovhaness's Floating World, and Ezra Laderman's Magic Prison. William Walton dedicated his Capriccio burlesco to Kostelanetz, who conducted the first performance and made the first recording, both with the New York Philharmonic.

His last concert was A Night in Old Vienna with the San Francisco Symphony Orchestra at that city's War Memorial Opera House on December 31, 1979.

Personal life
His first wife was actress/singer Sarah Loy; they were married from 1923 to 1937, when the marriage was dissolved. He was then married to soprano Lily Pons from 1938 to 1958, when they divorced. They owned a home in Palm Springs, California which was built in 1955. In 1960 he married Sara Gene Orcutt; the marriage lasted several years. All three unions were childless.

His brother, Boris Kostelanetz (1911–2006), was a prominent tax defense lawyer.

Death
After the December 31, 1979 concert with the San Francisco Symphony Orchestra, Kostelanetz left for a vacation in Haiti. While in Haiti, Kostelanetz contracted pneumonia and died on January 13, 1980, aged 78.

Discography (partial)
Many of the early LP releases were actually re-releases of albums released earlier on 78 rpm records. Musical Comedy Favorites, for example, was released as Volume 1 (album M-430) in late 1940 for songs 1 through 8, and Volume 2 (M-502) in 1941 for the remaining 8 songs on the second side of the LP.

Four of Kostelanetz's albums made the Billboard Hot 200, no match for his Columbia easy listening rivals Ray Conniff and Percy Faith but typical of many of popular instrumental easy listening artists of the day whose audience did not buy their albums immediately upon release but bought them over the years.

 Andre Kostelanetz & His Orchestra: "Carmen" LP #693cl735 Columbia 1950 U.S.A.
 Music of Sigmund Romberg,1946, Columbia Masterworks MM635
 The Music of Victor Herbert, Columbia Masterworks M-415
 Tchaikovsky: Nutcracker Suite, Op. 71a, 1956, Columbia Long Playing CL 730
 Music of Irving Berlin, 1950, Columbia Masterworks MM/ML-4314
 The Music of Stephen Foster, 1941, 3 LP Set, Columbia Masterworks M-442 78's
 Mississippi Suite, 1947, Columbia Masterworks MX-284 12" album
 The Music of Chopin, 1949, Columbia Masterworks MM-840
 Waltzes of Johann Strauss, 1948, Columbia Masterworks ML-2011   10" album
 Music of Cole Porter, 1948, Columbia Masterworks ML-2014
 Music of George Gershwin, 1948, Columbia Masterworks 2026
 Mississippi Suite, 1948, Columbia Masterworks ML-2046   10" album
 Invitation to the Waltz, 1948, Columbia Masterworks ML-2069  10" album
 Swan Lake, Columbia Masterworks ML-4308   1950
 An American in Paris, Columbia Masterworks ML-4455  1951
 Black Magic, 1955, Columbia CL 712
 Grofé: Grand Canyon Suite, 1955, Columbia CL 716
 Prokofiev, Peter and the Wolf & Saint-Seans, Carnival of the Animals, 1955, Columbia CL 720
 Music of Vincent Youmans, 1955, Columbia CL 734
 Verdi: Aida, 1955, Columbia CL 755
  Bravo!, 1955, Columbia CL 758
 Vienna Nights, 1955, Columbia CL 769
 Music of Fritz Kreisler, Music of Sigmund Romberg, 1955, Columbia CL 771
 You and the Night and the Music, 1955, Columbia CL 772
 Musical Comedy Favorites, 1955, Columbia CL 775
 Music of Jerome Kern, 1955, Columbia CL 776
 The Lure of the Tropics, 1955, Columbia CL 780
 Stardust, 1955, Columbia CL 781
 Kostelanetz Conducts..., 1955, Columbia CL 786
 An American In Paris/Rhapsody In Blue, 1955, Columbia CL 795
 La Boheme for Orchestra, 1955, Columbia CL 797
 Clair de Lune and Popular Favorites, 1955, Columbia CL 798  
 La Traviata, 1955 Columbia CL 799
 The Sleeping Beauty, 1956, Columbia CL 804
 Strauss Waltzes, 1956, Columbia CL 805
 Calendar Girl, 1956, Columbia  CL 811 
 Bolero!, 1956, Columbia CL 833
 The Very Thought of You, 1956, Columbia CL 843
 Music of Chopin, 1956, Columbia CL 862
 Cafe Continental, 1956, Columbia CL 863
 Beautiful Dreamer: Music of Stephen Foster, 1956, Columbia CL 864
 Broadway Spectacular, 1956, Columbia CL 865
 Madame Butterfly, 1956, Columbia CL 869
 Tender Is the Night, 1956, Columbia CL 886
 The Lure of Spain, 1957, Columbia CL 943
 Rigoletto, 1957, Columbia CL 970
 The Romantic Music of Rachmaninoff, 1957, Columbia CL 1001
 The Lure of France, 1958, Columbia CL 1054/CS 8111
 The Columbia Album of Richard Rodgers, Vol. 1, 1958, Columbia CL 1068
 The Columbia Album of Richard Rodgers, Vol. 2, 1958, Columbia CL 1069
 Blues Opera, 1958, Columbia CL 1099
 Encore!, 1958, Columbia CL 1135/CS 8008
 Theatre Party, 1958, Columbia CL 1199/CS 8026
 The Romantic Music of Tchaikovsky, Vol. 1, 1958, Columbia CL 1208
 The Romantic Music of Tchaikovsky, Vol. 2, 1958, Columbia CL 1209
 Romantic Arias for Orchestra, 1959, Columbia CL 1263
 Flower Drum Song, 1959, Columbia CL 1280/CS 8095
 Great Waltzes, 1959, Columbia CL 1321
 The Lure of Paradise, 1959, Columbia CL 1335/CS 8144
 Strauss Waltzes, 1959, Columbia CL 1354/CS 8162
 Gypsy Passion, 1960, Columbia CL 1431/CS 8228
 Joy to the World, 1960, Columbia CL 1528/CS 8328
 The Unsinkable Molly Brown, 1960, Columbia CL 1576/CS 8376
 Kostelanetz Favorites Columbia ML 4065
 The Nutcracker Suite, 1961, Columbia Masterworks 6264
 The New Wonderland of Sound, 1961, Columbia CL 1657/CS 8457
 Star Spangled Marches, 1962, Columbia CL 1718/CS 8518
 Broadway's Greatest Hits, 1962, Columbia CL 1827/CS 8627
 Fire and Jealousy, Columbia CL 1898/CS 8698
 Music from "Mr. President", 1962, Columbia CL 1921/CS 8721
 World Favorite Romantic Concertos for Piano & Orchestra, 1963, Columbia Masterworks ML 5876/MS 6476
 Wonderland of Sound, 1963, Columbia-CL-1938
 Wonderland of Golden Hits, 1963, Columbia CL 2039/CS 8839
 Wonderland of Christmas, 1963, Columbia CL 2068/CS 8868
 Kostelanetz in Wonderland: Golden Encores, 1963, Columbia CL 2078/CS 8878
 New York Wonderland, 1964, Columbia CL 2138/CS 8938 - #68 Billboard Albums
 I Wish You Love, 1964, Columbia CL 2185/CS 8985
 New Orleans Wonderland, 1964, Columbia CL 2250/CS 9050
 The Romantic Strings of Andre Kostelanetz, 1965, Columbia Masterworks ML 6119/MS 6711
 Wishing You a Merry Christmas, 1965, Columbia Masterworks ML 6179/MS 6779
 Romantic Waltzes by Tchaikovsky, 1965, Columbia Masterworks MS 6824
 Warsaw Concerto, 1966, Columbia Masterworks ML 6226/MS 6826 (reissue of 1963 ML 5876/MS 6476)
 Today's Golden Hits, 1966, Columbia CS 9334
 The Shadow of Your Smile, 1966, Columbia CS 13285
 Season's Greetings from Barbra Streisand and Friends,1967, Columbia Special Products, CSS 1075
 Exotic Nights, 1967, Columbia CS 9381
 The Kostelanetz Sound of Today, 1967, Columbia CS 9409
 Today's Greatest Movie Hits, 1967, Columbia CS 9556
 Scarborough Fair, 1968, Columbia CS 9623
 For the Young at Heart, 1968, Columbia CS 9691
 Sounds of Love, 1968, Columbia - #194 Billboard Albums
 Traces, 1969, Columbia CS 9823 - #200 Billboard Albums
 Andre Kostelanetz Conducts Puccini's "La Boheme" for Orchestra, 1969, Columbia Masterworks MS 7219
 Greatest Hits of the '60s, 1970, Columbia CS 9973
 I'll Never Fall in Love Again, 1970, Columbia CS 9998
 Everything Is Beautiful, 1970, Columbia 30037
 Sunset, 1970, Columbia Masterworks 30075
 And God Created Great Whales (Hovhaness), 1971, Columbia 30390
 Love Story, 1971, Columbia 30501 - #183 Billboard Albums
 For All We Know, 1971, Columbia 30672
 Plays Chicago, 1971, Columbia 31002
 Plays Cole Porter, 1972, Columbia 31491
 Love Theme from "The Godfather", 1972, Harmony 31500
 Last Tango in Paris, 1973, Columbia 32187
 Moon River, 1973, Columbia 32243
 Plays Great Hits of Today, 1973, Columbia 32415
 The Way We Were, 1974, Columbia 32578
 Plays Michel Legrand's Greatest Hits, 1974, Columbia 32580
 Plays Music of Villa-Lobos, 1974, Columbia 32821
 Plays Gershwin, 1974, Columbia 32825
 Musical Reflections of Broadway and Hollywood, 1974, Columbia 33061
 Plays "Murder on the Orient Express" and Other Great Themes, 1975, Columbia 33437
 Never Can Say Goodbye, 1975, Columbia 33550
 I'm Easy, 1976, Columbia 34157
 Dance With Me, 1976, Columbia 34352
 Plays Broadway's Greatest Hits, 1977, Columbia 34864
 You Light Up My Life, 1978, Columbia 35328
 Theme from "Superman", 1979, Columbia 35781
 Various Themes'', 1980, Columbia 36382
 The Complete Christmas Album, 2018 - #20 Billboard Classical Albums

References

Bibliography

External links

 
Andre Kostelanetz Collection, 1922-1984 and the online Andre Kostelanetz Collection at the Library of Congress
Andre Kostelanetz Recordings Collection at the University of Maryland Libraries

1901 births
1980 deaths
20th-century American conductors (music)
20th-century American male musicians
American classical pianists
Male classical pianists
American male conductors (music)
American music arrangers
American people of Russian-Jewish descent
American radio personalities
Classical musicians from California
Columbia Records artists
Deaths from pneumonia in Haiti
Easy listening musicians
Emigrants from the Russian Empire to the United States
Jewish American classical musicians
Musicians from Palm Springs, California
Musicians from Saint Petersburg
Russian Jews
20th-century American Jews